"To the Aisle" is a 1957 song recorded by The Five Satins with songwriting credits to group members Jim Freeman, Jessie Murphy, Bill Baker, Tommy Killebrew, and John Brown. The arrangement included an alto saxophone and an oboe played in harmony during the bridge and the oboe at the song's closing, very unusual for the time.

Track listing

7" Vinyl
"To the Aisle"
"Wish I Had My Baby"

Chart performance
In July 1957, the song peaked at #5 on the R&B charts and #25 on the Hot 100.

In popular culture
The song is featured in the film American Graffiti (1973).

References

External links
 https://web.archive.org/web/20070929093103/http://www.vocalgroup.org/inductees/the_five_satins.html

1957 singles
Songs about marriage
1957 songs